UFC Fight Night: de Randamie vs. Ladd (also known as UFC Fight Night 155 or UFC on ESPN+ 13) was a mixed martial arts event produced by the Ultimate Fighting Championship that was held on July 13, 2019 at Golden 1 Center in Sacramento, California.

Background
A women's bantamweight bout between the inaugural UFC Women's Featherweight Champion Germaine de Randamie and Aspen Ladd served as the event headliner.

The event marked the return of former WEC Featherweight Champion, former UFC Bantamweight Championship challenger and 2017 UFC Hall of Fame inductee Urijah Faber who returned to action 30 months after announcing his retirement, to fight in his hometown. He faced Ricky Simón in a bantamweight bout.

A women's strawweight bout between Cynthia Calvillo and former Invicta FC Strawweight Champion Lívia Renata Souza was scheduled for this event. However it was reported on June 7, that Calvillo broke her foot and was forced to pull out of the bout. Souza instead faced fellow former Invicta FC Strawweight champion Brianna Van Buren.

A middleweight bout between Karl Roberson and John Phillips was scheduled for this event. However on June 14, it was reported that Phillips was pulled from the bout due to injury and he was replaced by promotional newcomer Wellington Turman.

A bantamweight bout between 2004 Olympic silver medalist in wrestling and former UFC Women's Bantamweight Championship challenger Sara McMann and inaugural UFC Women's Flyweight Champion Nicco Montaño (also The Ultimate Fighter: A New World Champion flyweight winner) was scheduled for this event. However, it was reported on June 19, that McMann pulled out of the bout citing an injury and she was replaced by The Ultimate Fighter: Team Rousey vs. Team Tate bantamweight winner Julianna Peña.

Martin Day was expected to face Benito Lopez at the event. However on June 24, Day pulled out of the bout due to a knee surgery and was replaced by Vince Morales.

Gian Villante was expected to face Mike Rodríguez at the event. However, Villante pulled out on July 4 due to undisclosed reasons. He was replaced by promotional newcomer John Allan.

Beneil Dariush was expected to face Drakkar Klose at the event. However on July 7, Dariush pulled out due to an injury. As a result, UFC officials removed Klose from the card and he is expected to be scheduled for a future event instead.

Results

Bonus awards 
The following fighters received $50,000 bonuses:
Fight of the Night: No bonus awarded.
Performance of the Night: Urijah Faber, Josh Emmett, Andre Fili  and Jonathan Martinez

Reported payout
The following is the reported payout to the fighters as reported to the California State Athletic Commission. It does not include sponsor money and also does not include the UFC's traditional "fight night" bonuses. The total disclosed payout for the event was $1,274,000.
 Germaine de Randamie: $90,000 (includes $45,000 win bonus) def. Aspen Ladd: $35,000
 Urijah Faber: $340,000 (includes $170,000 win bonus) def. Ricky Simón: $23,000
 Josh Emmett: $98,000 (includes $49,000 win bonus) def. Mirsad Bektić: $38,000
 Karl Roberson: $50,000 (includes $25,000 win bonus) def. Wellington Turman: $12,000
 Marvin Vettori: $40,000 (includes $20,000 win bonus) def. Cezar Ferreira: $45,000
 John Allan: $24,000 (includes $12,000 win bonus) def. Mike Rodríguez: $20,000 
 Andre Fili: $80,000 (includes $40,000 win bonus) def. Sheymon Moraes: $21,000
 Julianna Peña: $80,000 (includes $40,000 win bonus) def. Nicco Montaño: $30,000 
 Ryan Hall: $70,000 (includes $35,000 win bonus) def. Darren Elkins: $62,000
 Jonathan Martinez: $28,000 (includes $14,000 win bonus) def. Pingyuan Liu: $14,000
 Briana Van Buren: $24,000 (includes $12,000 win bonus) def. Lívia Renata Souza: $12,000
 Benito Lopez: $24,000 (includes $12,000 win bonus) def. Vince Morales: $14,000

Aftermath 
On August 13, 2019, it was announced by the California State Athletic Commission that John Allan tested positive for tamoxifen in a fight night test. He faced a one-year suspension, fines, and the reversal of his decision win against Mike Rodríguez to a no contest.

See also 

 List of UFC events
 2019 in UFC
 List of current UFC fighters

References 

UFC Fight Night
2019 in mixed martial arts
Mixed martial arts in California
Mixed martial arts in Sacramento, California
Sports competitions in Sacramento, California
2019 in sports in California
July 2019 sports events in the United States
Events in Sacramento, California